The men's 50 kilometre freestyle cross-country skiing competition at the 1988 Winter Olympics in Calgary, Canada, was held on 27 February 1988 at the Canmore Nordic Centre.

Each skier started at half a minute intervals, skiing the entire 50 kilometre course. Maurilio De Zolt of Italy was the 1987 World champion and Thomas Wassberg was the defending champion from the 1984 Olympics in Sarajevo, Yugoslavia.

Results
Sources:

References

External links
 Final results (International Ski Federation)

Men's 50 kilometre
Men's 50 kilometre cross-country skiing at the Winter Olympics